() was a German Naval World War II hand-cipher system used as a backup method when no working Enigma machine was available.

The cipher had two stages: a transposition followed by bigram substitution. In the transposition stage, the cipher clerk would write out the plaintext into a "cage" — a shape on a piece of paper. Pairs of letters were then substituted using a set of bigram tables.

The  cipher was first solved at Bletchley Park in June 1941 by means of documents captured from U-boat  the previous month. Thereafter it was solved using cryptanalysis for over three years. Some 1,400 signals were read during that period. The section working on RHV was headed by historian Sir John H. Plumb. The decrypts were sometimes useful in themselves for the intelligence that they contained, but were more important as a source for cribs for solving Naval Enigma.

A Mediterranean variant was known as Schlüssel Henno, which was first tackled — unsuccessfully — in May 1943. It was not until after a capture of cipher documents from a raid on Mykonos in April 1944 that the Naval Section was able to read Henno. With over 1,000 signals a month, up to 30 people were assigned to solve the messages. A separate version of RHV existed for U-boats to use, called RHV Offizier. Only six messages in RHV Offizier were broken at Bletchley Park, three by James Hogarth. The work was abandoned in August 1944 after it was found the intelligence value of the decrypts was "rather disappointing".

See also
Werftschlüssel

Sources

External links

A detailed description of the German Reservehandverfahren (R.H.V.) M.Dv.Nr. 929/1
Scanned cover of a 1940 Reservehandverfahren manual
The Archives of German technical Manuals 1900-1945 (includes the Reservehandverfahren manual)

Classical ciphers
Enigma machine
History of telecommunications in Germany
Research and development in Nazi Germany
Signals intelligence of World War II